Jolien D'hoore (born 14 March 1990) is a Belgian former track and road cyclist, who rode professionally between 2007 and 2021 for the , , ,  and  teams. D'hoore is a 29-time national track champion as well as a four-time national road champion at all competition levels. She won the bronze medal in the omnium at the 2016 Olympics and during her career was one of the strongest sprinters in the women's peloton. Since retiring as a rider, D'hoore now works as a directeur sportif for UCI Women's Continental Team .

Career
Most notably, she won the Belgian national road race championship in 2012. At the 2012 Summer Olympics, she was 5th in the Women's omnium. D'hoore signed with the  team for the 2015 season, winning 13 races in her first year with the team to become the most prolific winner in the women's peloton in 2015.

D'hoore won the bronze medal in the omnium at the 2016 Olympics. She won her first gold medal in her career in track cycling in the European championships. She won the madison with her partner, Lotte Kopecky. In 2017 they repeated this feat at the World Championships in Hong Kong.

Major results

Track

2005
 2nd Omnium, National Junior Championships
2006
 National Junior Championships
1st  500m time trial
1st  Sprint
1st  Scratch
2nd Points race
2nd Individual pursuit
2nd Omnium
2007
 National Championships
1st  500m time trial
1st  Sprint
1st  Scratch
1st  Team pursuit
1st  Omnium
2nd Individual pursuit
2nd Keirin
2nd Points race
2008
 National Championships
1st  500m time trial
1st  Team pursuit
1st  Individual pursuit
1st  Team sprint
1st  Sprint
 UEC European Junior Championships
2nd  Team pursuit
2nd  Individual pursuit
2nd  Points race
3rd  Scratch
2009
 National Championships
1st  500m time trial
1st  Team pursuit
1st  Team sprint
 2nd  Team pursuit, UEC European Under-23 Championships
2010
 UEC European Under-23 Championships
1st  Omnium
1st  Team pursuit
3rd  Points race
 National Championships
1st  500m time trial
1st  Scratch
1st  Individual pursuit
1st  Omnium
1st  Team pursuit
1st  Team sprint
2nd Points race
2012
 UEC European Under-23 Championships
1st  Points race
2nd  Team pursuit
 1st  Omnium, National Championships
2013
 Grand Prix of Poland
1st Points race
3rd Omnium
3rd Scratch
 3 Jours d'Aigle
1st Individual pursuit
1st Scratch
3rd Points race
 2nd Omnium, International Belgian Open
 3rd  Omnium, 2013–14 UCI Track Cycling World Cup, Aguascalientes
2014
 Omnium, 2014–15 UCI Track Cycling World Cup
1st  Guadalajara
2nd  London
 1st  Omnium, National Championships
 Cottbus Championships
1st 500m time trial
1st Omnium
1st Points race
 1st Cottbuser Nächte Omnium
 1st Sprintermeeting Omnium
 1st International Belgian Open Omnium
 2nd  Omnium, UEC European Championships
2015
 1st  Omnium, National Championships
 2015–16 UCI Track Cycling World Cup, Cambridge
2nd  Scratch
3rd  Omnium
 2nd Omnium, Revolution – Derby
 2nd Zesdaagse Vlaanderen-Gent
2016
 1st  Points race, 2015–16 UCI Track Cycling World Cup, Hong Kong
 UEC European Championships
1st  Madison
2nd  Points race
 National Championships
1st  500m time trial
1st  Scratch
1st  Points race
1st  Individual pursuit
 3rd  Omnium, Olympic Games
2017
 UCI World Championships
1st  Madison
3rd  Scratch
 2017–18 UCI Track Cycling World Cup
1st  Madison, Pruszków
2nd  Madison, Manchester
3rd  Scratch, Manchester
 Belgian International Track Meeting
1st Scratch
1st Madison
 Zesdaagse Vlaanderen-Gent
1st Points race
2nd Madison
2018
 2nd  Scratch, UCI World Championships
 3rd  Scratch, UEC European Championships
 Madison, 2018–19 UCI Track Cycling World Cup
3rd  Berlin
3rd  London
2019
 National Championships
1st  Scratch
1st  Points race
 2018–19 UCI Track Cycling World Cup
1st  Madison, Cambridge
2nd  Madison, Hong Kong
3rd  Scratch, Hong Kong
 2019–20 UCI Track Cycling World Cup, Hong Kong
2nd  Team pursuit
3rd  Omnium
 3rd  Scratch, UCI World Championships
2020
 2nd  Madison, 2019–20 UCI Track Cycling World Cup, Milton

Road

2008
 1st  Road race, UCI Junior World Championships
 National Junior Road Championships
1st  Road race
3rd Time trial
 1st Stage 1 Omloop van Borsele
2009
 1st Wodecq Criterium
2010
 9th Sparkassen Giro
2012
 1st  Road race, National Road Championships
 10th Le Samyn des Dames
 10th Omloop van het Hageland
2013
 1st Dwars door de Westhoek
 1st Grand Prix of Poland
 2nd Knokke-Heist – Bredene
 3rd Cholet Pays de Loire Dames
 9th Ronde van Gelderland
2014
 1st  Road race, National Road Championships
 1st Diamond Tour
 1st Stage 5 Holland Ladies Tour
 2nd Overall BeNe Ladies Tour
1st  Points classification
1st Stages 1 & 2b
 2nd Cholet Pays de Loire Dames
 2nd Ronde van Gelderland
 2nd Dwars door de Westhoek
 4th Novilon EDR Cup
 4th Sparkassen Giro
 7th Overall Ladies Tour of Qatar
 7th La Course by Le Tour de France
2015
 National Road Championships
1st  Road race
2nd Time trial
 1st  Overall BeNe Ladies Tour
1st  Points classification
1st Stages 1, 2a (ITT) & 2b
 1st Omloop van het Hageland
 1st Ronde van Drenthe World Cup
 1st Diamond Tour
 1st Crescent Women World Cup Vårgårda
 Holland Ladies Tour
1st Stages 1 & 2
 2nd Overall The Women's Tour
1st Stage 2
 2nd Tour of Flanders
 2nd Dwars door de Westhoek
 2nd La Course by Le Tour de France
 3rd Overall UCI Women's Road World Cup
 4th Cholet Pays de Loire Dames
 4th Gent–Wevelgem
 4th Ronde van Gelderland
 5th Le Samyn des Dames
 6th Overall Ladies Tour of Qatar
 8th Overall Energiewacht Tour
1st Stage 1
 8th Sparkassen Giro
2016
 1st  Overall BeNe Ladies Tour
1st  Points classification
1st Stages 1, 3 (ITT) & 4
 1st Diamond Tour
 1st Madrid Challenge by La Vuelta
 3rd Road race, National Road Championships
 5th Pajot Hills Classic
 6th Overall Tour de Feminin-O cenu Českého Švýcarska
1st  Points classification
1st Stage 4
 10th Road race, UCI Road World Championships
2017
 1st  Road race, National Road Championships
 1st  Overall Tour of Chongming Island
1st  Mountains classification
1st Stages 2 & 3
 1st Omloop van het Hageland
 1st Grand Prix de Dottignies
 1st Madrid Challenge by La Vuelta
 1st Stage 1 Ladies Tour of Norway
 1st Stage 4 Giro Rosa
 1st Stage 5 The Women's Tour
 2nd Gent–Wevelgem
 4th Overall Belgium Tour
1st  Belgian rider classification
1st Prologue & Stage 2
 5th Gooik–Geraardsbergen–Gooik
 6th Road race, UEC European Road Championships
 6th Ronde van Drenthe
 6th RideLondon Classique
 7th Omloop Het Nieuwsblad
 7th Dwars door de Westhoek
2018
 1st Three Days of Bruges–De Panne
 1st Stage 1 The Women's Tour
 Giro Rosa
1st Stages 3 & 4
 2nd Drentse Acht van Westerveld
 2nd Gent–Wevelgem
 3rd Omloop van het Hageland
 4th Brabantse Pijl Dames Gooik
 5th Overall BeNe Ladies Tour
 7th RideLondon Classique
 8th Overall Tour of Chongming Island
 8th Omloop Het Nieuwsblad
2019
 The Women's Tour
1st Stages 1 & 3
 1st Stage 1 Emakumeen Euskal Bira
 2nd Time trial, National Road Championships
 6th Overall Healthy Ageing Tour
 7th Durango-Durango Emakumeen Saria
2020
 1st Gent–Wevelgem
 2nd Road race, National Road Championships
2021
 1st Stage 1 Healthy Ageing Tour
 2nd Dwars door de Westhoek
 3rd Classic Brugge–De Panne
 5th Dwars door het Hageland
 6th Overall Belgium Tour
 6th Nokere Koerse
 7th Diamond Tour

References

External links

1990 births
Living people
Belgian female cyclists
Olympic bronze medalists for Belgium
Olympic cyclists of Belgium
Cyclists at the 2012 Summer Olympics
Cyclists at the 2016 Summer Olympics
Cyclists at the 2020 Summer Olympics
Medalists at the 2016 Summer Olympics
Olympic medalists in cycling
Sportspeople from Ghent
Cyclists from East Flanders
UCI Track Cycling World Champions (women)
Belgian track cyclists
Directeur sportifs